Prakriti Kakar is an Indian singer. Born in New Delhi, her career began upon singing the title song of 2012 Bollywood film Tutiya Dil. Subsequently, she performed few tracks for films released in 2013, providing mostly backing vocals. She then released songs in collaboration with Ankit Tiwari: "Katra Katra" from Alone and "Bheegh Loon" from Khamoshiyan. She, along with her twin sister Sukriti Kakar, released independent music videos including "Sudhar Ja", "Mafiyaan", "Kehndi Haa Kehndi Naa", "Hum Tum", "Sona Lagda", and "Majnu".

Life and career

1995–2011: early life
Prakriti Kakar was born in New Delhi, India on May 8, 1995. Except for her father, everyone in the family sings, including her sister Akriti and twin sister Sukriti and she began learning music from her mother, who is a music teacher. Her inclination towards music led her mother to decide on training her professionally. Kakar trained in classical music for seven years and started playing keyboard and western music during the time. Since her elder sister, Akriti Kakar wanted to sing in Bollywood, she moved to Mumbai with her dad while Prakriti and the rest of her family accompanied them later. Talking about her childhood, Kakar stated; "When I came here, I was told that we are going to Mumbai for a holiday. I was in school back then. Imagine my surprise when I was enrolled in school here and realised we were here for good. This city was a culture shock for me".

2012–2020: Bollywood releases
Kakar began her career with the title song of Tutiya Dil (2012) which was composed by Gulraj Singh and performed with Ram Sampath. She next appeared in the track "Goti Song" from Nasha (2013) together with Akshay Deodhar and her twin sister Sukriti Kakar. Her appearance in the song was much sidelined same as her next release in the year, the title track of Boss composed by Meet Bros. Another performance of her "Mujhse Hogi Shurvaat" was released by "I Paid a Bribe" and the Shankar Mahadevan Academy as an initiative to tackle corruption. Apart from Kakar, the song is rendered by Mahadevan, Sukriti Kakar and Chetan Naik. The song was nominated in the best activist anthem category of Honesty Oscars 2014.

In June 2014, Ankit Tiwari heard Kakar singing in a fashion show and requested her to be a part of his shows as female vocalist. It was then she was offered to sing for the song "Katra Katra" from Alone (2015). With her own little inflections and variations, the recording was accomplished in two hours. According to Tiwari, her voice had the "required element" for a song of the genre. Elaborating further Kakar stated; "I had to sound very innocent, like I am in love but at the same time, it was a song where I am seducing a guy so it had to be sensuous". Kakar next performed the female version of the song "Bheegh Loon" from the film Khamoshiyan which is again composed by Tiwari. Kasmin Fernandes from The Times of India mentioned that she "doesn't try to sound sensual yet manages to convey the mood required for a song in an erotic thriller".

2021–present: pop music 
Beside filmy songs, Kakar has sung some non-filmy songs. She along with her sister, Sukriti Kakar has sung "Mafiyan", "Kehndi Haan Kehndi Naa", "Majnu" and many more.

In September 2021, the duo sisters along with Amaal Mallik collaborated with Dua Lipa for Indian remix version of "Levitating", which became a global hit.

Media 
In March 2021, Prakriti along with her sister Sukriti Kakar featured at No. 2 position on the global Billboard charts for their song "Naari". Later that year in October, Kakar along with Sukriti Kakar featured at the Times Square in New York City.

Influences
Kakar named Whitney Houston, Beyoncé, Mariah Carey and Christina Aguilera among the Western artists and Sunidhi Chauhan from Indian artists, as her influences. She also picked Meet Bros and A. R. Rahman as her favorite composers.

Discography

Film songs

Non-film songs

References

External links 

 

Living people
Bollywood playback singers
Indian women playback singers
1995 births
Singers from Delhi
Women musicians from Delhi
21st-century Indian women singers
21st-century Indian singers